David Joseph Maley (born April 24, 1963) is an American radio and television analyst for the San Jose Sharks and former professional hockey player. He played in the National Hockey League with the Montreal Canadiens, New Jersey Devils, Edmonton Oilers, San Jose Sharks and New York Islanders between 1986 and 1994.

Hockey career 
Maley was a part of the University of Wisconsin–Madison team that won the NCAA Division I hockey championship in 1983, and a member of the Montreal Canadiens when they won the Stanley Cup in 1986.

Broadcasting career 
Maley is a pre-game analyst and intermission reporter for Sharks radio broadcasts. He also joins Dan Rusanowsky and Baker, now Hedican in a "triple-cast" format during some regular season and home playoff games.

Personal life 
Maley grew up in Edina, Minnesota. He is an uncle of NFL tight end Rhett Ellison.

A resident of San Jose, Maley owns Rollin' Ice, a roller hockey facility. He is also the president of the Silver Creek Sportsplex, an indoor sports and fitness facility in San Jose.

Career statistics

Regular season and playoffs

International

See also
 Striker's Den

References

External links
 

1963 births
Living people
Albany River Rats players
American men's ice hockey left wingers
Edmonton Oilers players
Ice hockey people from Minnesota
Ice hockey players from Minnesota
Sportspeople from Edina, Minnesota
Montreal Canadiens draft picks
Montreal Canadiens players
National Hockey League broadcasters
NCAA men's ice hockey national champions
New Jersey Devils players
New York Islanders players
People from Beaver Dam, Wisconsin
San Francisco Spiders players
San Jose Sharks players
San Jose Sharks announcers
Stanley Cup champions
Sherbrooke Canadiens players
Utica Devils players